Gwanaksan (Korean for Mt. Gwanak; 632 m) is a mountain in southern Seoul, South Korea.  Portions lie in the Gwanak-gu and Geumcheon-gu districts of Seoul; other portions lie in the neighboring cities of Anyang, Gyeonggi and Gwacheon.

The name gwanak means "hat-shaped peak," and refers to its gat-like profile.  Thus Gwanaksan literally means "mountain of the hat-shaped peak."  Currently it is referred to as "Gwanak," since san already contains the meaning of "mountain." Together with Songaksan in Kaesong, Gamaksan in Paju, Uaksan in Pocheon, and Hwaaksan in Gapyeong, Gwanaksan was long considered one of the five representative peaks of Gyeonggi-do (gyeonggi o-ak).

The main campus of Seoul National University is located just northwest of the mountain, and the Gwacheon national government complex lies to the east.  Also nearby is the Anyang Resort Area, a popular local tourist attraction.  On the mountain itself lie numerous Buddhist temples, including Wongaksa.  Most of the mountain slope is protected land.  The mountain is very popular with older climbers, since it can easily be reached by Seoul's public transportation. Annual hiking traffic is close to 5 million people. The Seoul side was designated a city park in 1968.

Trails
Seoul National University Entrance (11.3 km, 4 hours)
Siheung-dong (11 km, 3 hours, 30 minutes)
Anyang amusement park (12 km, 4 hours, 30 minutes)

Gallery

References

See also
 List of mountains in Seoul
 List of mountains in Korea
 Yangjaecheon

Mountains of Seoul
Mountains of Gyeonggi Province
Gwanak District
Geumcheon District
Anyang, Gyeonggi
Gwacheon
Mountains of South Korea